Mita Vashisht (born 2 November 1967) is an Indian actress. Known for her work on screen, stage and television, she has played a wide range of roles. Her most prominent appearances includes; sci-fi television series Space City Sigma (1989-1991), Pachpan Khambe Laal Deewarein, Swabhimaan, Alaan (Kirdaar) to Trishna in Kahani Ghar Ghar Ki and Jethi Maa in Kaala Teeka to film roles with a wide spectrum of directors with different cinema styles.

Early life
Mita Vashisht was born on 2 November 1967 in Pune, Maharashtra, India to Captain Rajeshwar Dutt Vashisht, who retired as a colonel from the Indian Army and Meenakshi Mehta (née) Vashisht, a teacher and a singer (Indian Classical).

She has done her post-graduation in literature from Punjab University, Chandigarh and graduated from the National School of Drama (Delhi) in 1987, Vashisht was for several years (1990–2010) also visiting faculty to some of the premier design, film and theatre institutes of India – the NIFT (Delhi), FTII (Pune), NSD (Delhi) and the NID (Ahmedabad). She has also conducted theatre workshops in the UK (London, Birmingham, Leicester) and in Damascus. She teaches students of fashion design, film direction and acting, using theatre techniques. She is married to filmmaker Anup Singh.

Career
Vashisht has played the lead roles in the avant-garde cinemas (notably Kumar Shahani and Mani Kaul films), the middle of the road cinemas (Notably Govind Nihalani's films) as well as in successful big budget Bollywood films. She has worked in theatre as actress and director too. She researches and writes her scripts as well. Since 2004, she has performed her solo play in English and Hindi, titled, Lal Ded, based on life of medieval Kashmiri mystic Lal Ded, all over India.

Vashisht has written and produced three short films, as well as a serial for television. She was the executive producer of the film The Name of a River, a BFI (London) - NFDC (India) - Bangladesh film co-production.

In June 2001, Vashisht established Mandala, space for arts collaborations research and education. Its aim was to spearhead a new movement in the arts, to centre stage and individuate the performing arts in society (she considers that imperative, in the face of an electronic media onslaught) and to aid artistic collaborations.

Her first project under Mandala however took an unusual twist. A chance theatre workshop that she conducted with trafficked minors in a remand home in Mumbai led to four years of her full-time involvement with the cause of self- empowerment and rehabilitation of trafficked minors. (trafficked minors i.e. minor girls rescued from prostitution from the city brothels).

As artistic director of Mandala she created Mandala TAM (theatre arts module), a methodology and a training process based on the performing arts that proved to be highly successful in helping the trafficked minors to heal and transform mentally, physically, emotionally and intellectually.
In wanting to mainstream the marginalized she created a theatre troupe of the trafficked young women who performed the comedy play 'the coffin is too big for the grave' to national and international audiences and at international theatre festivals).

Theatre
She has performed in the 75 minute solo theatre performance Lal Ded, based on the life and poetry of the iconic woman mystic and poet of Kashmir Lal Ded. Lal Ded performances have been invited to and featured in the following National/International theatre festivals in India and abroad.

2004: World Human Rights Day for the NGO 'Akshara', Mumbai.
2005: The Hungry Heart Int. Theatre Festival, India Habitat Centre, Delhi.
2006: The Hungry Heart International theatre festival, Delhi.
2006: World theatre day, Pune. (Alliance Francaise)
2007: National Centre for the Performing Arts, Mumbai
2008: Baharangam (the Int. theatre festival, NSD Delhi) commemorating NSD's golden jubilee year.
2008: International Sufi Festival of Performing Arts, Srinagar, Kashmir.
2008: National Theatre Festival, Dehradun
2008: World Performing Arts Festival, Lahore, Pakistan.
2009: North Zone Cultural Centre Festival, Chandigarh.

Film and television
She has also produced and directed television programs and documentaries. In 2012 she directed the documentary film She, of the Four Names, commissioned by Public Services Broadcasting Trust, India. (PSBT) based on Lal Ded.

In recent years Vashisht played a key role in Ekta Kapoor's Kahani Ghar Ghar ki. The portrayal of Trishna took the serial to new TRP heights, beating the sister rival serial Kyonki Saas Bhi Kabhi Bahu Thi for the first time in six years of its running. She played the role of the principal on the show Suvreen Guggal on Channel V India and Akbar's evil stepmother in the serial, Jodha Akbar on Zee TV. She was highly appreciated by the audience for her negative portrayal of Jethi Maa from TV Series Kaala Teeka.

Selected filmography
Key

Music videos and Singing
2000: Featured in the main lead in Mann ke Manjeeré.
2007: Sung the vocals with Shubha Mudgal for the theme song Laaga Chunari Mein Daag for Yash Raj Films.

Television

Film Jury member
2005: OSIAN'S CINEFAN International Film Festival, Delhi. Jury member for Indian Feature Films.
2008: Tenth MAMI International Film Festival, Mumbai. Jury Member for Dimensions India (Documentary films).
2008: Mumbai International Film Festival (MIFF) Jury member for Short films.

Awards
1996: Won, Star Screen Award, for Best Supporting Actress Drohkaal 
1990: Won, BFJA Awards Bengal Film Journalist Award, Best supporting Actress Drishti 
2019 :Won, Moonwhite Films International Film Fest (MWFIFF) Best Actress Supporting Role Mita Vasisht (Gulabi) Kasaai (The Devil)

References

External links
 Official website
 
 A non-conforming artiste – The Tribune, 2002

Vasiisht, Mita
Indian film actresses
Actresses in Tamil cinema
Indian television actresses
Indian theatre directors
Indian stage actresses
National School of Drama alumni
1967 births
Living people
Actresses in Hindi cinema
Actresses from Pune
21st-century Indian actresses
Actresses in Hindi television
Indian women theatre directors
Actresses in Bengali cinema
Actresses in Marathi theatre
Actresses in Malayalam cinema
Screen Awards winners